The Taoyuan Arena is an indoor sporting arena located in Taoyuan City, Taoyuan County, Taiwan. The capacity of the arena is 15,000 and was opened in 1993. It is used to host indoor sporting events, such as basketball and volleyball.

See also
 List of stadiums in Taiwan

References

Indoor arenas in Taiwan
Volleyball venues in Taiwan
Basketball venues in Taiwan